Jean-Baptiste Gouffet (1669 in Paris – 1729 in Lyon) was a French organist and composer.

A Franciscan priest, Gouffet seems to have devoted his life entirely to God and to music. Organist in the Franciscan community of St Bonaventure, he composed many organ pieces, all lost. He was also recognized in his time for his talents as a singer and conductor.

Gouffet is the author of nine Leçons de ténèbres, composed in 1705, and of several collections of short motets, mostly for alto and basso continuo.

He was one of the many lyonnais masters of music of that time.

References

External links 
 Jean-Baptiste Gouffet Lamentations
 Troisième leçon de Ténèbre du mercredi saint on Human Music
 Jean Baptiste Gouffet on Musicalics
 Jean-Baptiste Gouffet on ArkivMusic

Musicians from Paris
1669 births
1729 deaths
French classical organists
French male organists
French Baroque composers
French Franciscans
Male classical organists